Here Am I is the first international compilation album by Australian recording artist Judith Durham. The album contains tracks from Durham's two studio album, Gift of Song and Climb Ev'ry Mountain both on A&M Records.  The album was released in October 1972 and was the final release of Durham's on that label.

Track listing
 LP/ Cassette
 A1 "I Wish I Knew" (B. Taylor/D.Dallas)
 A2 "Skyline Pigeon" (E. John/B. Taupin)
 A3 "Wailing of the Willow" (Harry Nilsson)
 A4 "I'm Old Fashioned" (J. Kerr/J.Mercer)
 A5 "Kaleidoscope" (R.McKuen)
 A6 "Here Am I" (Mason Williams)
 B1 "The Light is Dark Enough" (Maitland/Kerr)
 B2 "Do You Believe" (Da Lema/C Baldwin)
 B3 "Gift of Song" (Patti Ingalle)
 B4 "Your Heart Is Free" (Le Vent et La Jeunese) (C.Chevallier, J.Shakespeare)
 B5 "I Can Say" (David Reilly)
 B6 "Climb Ev'ry Mountain" (R. Rodgers/O. Hammerstein II)

References

External links
 "Here Am I" at discogs.com

1972 compilation albums
Judith Durham compilation albums
A&M Records compilation albums